Melodeon Hall is a historic meeting hall and theatre building located at Rushville, Rush County, Indiana.  It was built in 1872, and is a two-story, Late Victorian style brick building.  The Melodeon Hall is located on the second floor and measures 58 feet wide by 42 feet long.  The lower-level houses three shops.

It was listed on the National Register of Historic Places in 1982. It is located in the Rushville Commercial Historic District.

References

Theatres on the National Register of Historic Places in Indiana
Victorian architecture in Indiana
Theatres completed in 1872
Buildings and structures in Rush County, Indiana
National Register of Historic Places in Rush County, Indiana
Historic district contributing properties in Indiana